Al Dhaid Cricket Village  is a multi-purpose stadium in Al Dhaid, Emirate of Sharjah. The ground is mainly used for organizing matches of football, cricket and other sports. The ground has floodlights so that the stadium can host day-night matches. The ground one of the few ground in the United Arab Emirates.

The ground was the host of 2015 ACC Twenty20 Cup along with Sharjah Cricket Stadium as well as 2009 ACC Twenty20 Cup.

References

External links 

 cricketarchive
 sharjahcricket
 espncricinfo

Sport in the Emirate of Sharjah
Cricket grounds in the United Arab Emirates
Multi-purpose stadiums in the United Arab Emirates
Sports venues completed in 2008
2008 establishments in the United Arab Emirates